Glenbrook may refer to:

Locations

Australia
Glenbrook, New South Wales

Canada
Glenbrook, Calgary, a neighbourhood in Alberta

Ireland
Glenbrook, County Cork, a small area in County Cork on the southeast tip of Ireland

New Zealand
Glenbrook, New Zealand

United States
Glenbrook, California
Glenbrook, Lake County, California
Glenbrook, Nevada County, California
Glenbrook (Stamford), a section of Stamford, Connecticut
Glenbrook, Nevada, the oldest settlement on Lake Tahoe
Glenbrook, Oregon

Transportation
Glenbrook station (Metro-North), in Glenbrook, Connecticut, United States
Glenbrook railway station (Ireland), a former station in Cork, Ireland
Glenbrook railway station, New South Wales, in Glenbrook, New South Wales, Australia
The Glenbrook, an American narrow-gauge steam railway locomotive

See also
Glenbrook High School (disambiguation), of several schools
Glenbrook Square, a super-regional mall in Fort Wayne, Indiana